Al-Nasr Sport Club, is an Iraqi football team based in Dhi Qar, that plays in Iraq Division Three.

Managerial history
 Mohsin Abu Ragheef

See also 
 2021–22 Iraq Division Three

References

External links
 Iraq Clubs- Foundation Dates

1992 establishments in Iraq
Association football clubs established in 1992
Football clubs in Dhi Qar